John Teague (June 3, 1833 – October 25, 1902) was a Canadian architect and politician who served as mayor of Victoria, British Columbia from 1894 until 1895.

Born in Redruth, Cornwall, United Kingdom, Teague left the UK in 1856 spending some time in California before emigrating to British Columbia in 1858. He was an alderman and mayor of Victoria from 1894 until 1895. As an architect and contractor, he played an important role in the design and construction of the most important churches, commercial, residential and civic buildings of his time in Victoria.

He was married twice: first to Emily Abington in 1863 and then to Eliza Lazenby in 1892.

Teague died in Victoria at the age of 67.

References

English emigrants to pre-Confederation British Columbia
Mayors of Victoria, British Columbia
People from Redruth
Canadian people of Cornish descent
1833 births
1902 deaths